The Pioneer and Endicott Buildings are two office buildings located in downtown Saint Paul, Minnesota, United States. The 1890-built Endicott building forms an L-shape around the 1889-built Pioneer Building. At its completion, the Pioneer building was the tallest in Saint Paul.  The Endicott building was designed by Cass Gilbert and James Knox Taylor; the Pioneer Building was designed by Solon Spencer Beman in the Romanesque style; it was the first building in the United States to have a glass elevator. Connected in the 1940s, they are together listed in the National Register of Historic Places. The Pioneer Building was the tallest building in Saint Paul, Minnesota from its construction in 1889 until 1915 when the Cathedral of St. Paul was constructed. It surpassed the Globe Building.

References

External links
 Pioneer Endicott
 Pioneer Building photos at the Minnesota Historical Society.
 Endicott Building photos at the Minnesota Historical Society.

Cass Gilbert buildings
National Register of Historic Places in Saint Paul, Minnesota
Office buildings completed in 1890
Office buildings on the National Register of Historic Places in Minnesota
Renaissance Revival architecture in Minnesota
Romanesque Revival architecture in Minnesota
Solon Spencer Beman buildings